Bob Haak may refer to:

 Bob Haak (American football) (1916–1992), American football player
 Bob Haak (art expert) (1926–2005), Dutch art historian